The following is a list of products released for the Vocaloid software in order of release date.

Products

Vocaloid

Vocaloid 2

VocaloWitter

iVocaloid

eVocaloid

Vocaloid 3

Vocaloid 4

Vocaloid 5

Vocaloid 6

Mobile Vocaloid Editor

Vocaloid Neo

Commercially unreleased

References

External links

 English product lineup

Vocaloid products
Vocaloid products